The 1946 Duke Blue Devils football team was an American football team that represented Duke University as a member of the Southern Conference (SoCon) during the 1946 college football season. In their 12th season under head coach Wallace Wade, the Blue Devils compiled a 4–5 record (3–2 against SoCon opponents) and outscored all opponent by a total of 134 to 86.

Duke led the SoCon with three players chosen as first-team picks on the 1946 All-Southern Conference football team: end Kelly Mote; tackle Al DeRogatis; and guard Bill Milner. DeRogatis was late inducted into the College Football Hall of Fame.

Schedule

1947 NFL Draft

The 1947 NFL Draft was held on December 16, 1946. The following Blue Devils were selected.

References

Duke
Duke Blue Devils football seasons
Duke Blue Devils football